Arnau Brugués-Davi and João Sousa were the defending champions but Arnau decided not to participate.
Sousa played alongside Frank Moser but lost in the first round.
Colin Ebelthite and Rameez Junaid won the title after defeating Christian Harrison and Michael Venus 6–4, 7–5 in the final.

Seeds

Draw

Draw

References
 Main Draw

Franken Challengeandnbsp;- Doubles
2013 Doubles